Ghazala Rafique ([Sindhi/Urdu: غزالہ رفيق], 1939 - January 1977) was a Pakistani radio, tv and film actress. She was also a  singer and hostess of Radio Pakistan Karachi. She was one of the most popular female TV actress's in the 1960s and 1970s.

Biography 
She was born in 1939 in Qamber Ali Khan, District Larkana (Now Qamber-Shahdadkot District). Her birth name was Bilquis Ansari. She was niece of renowned Sindhi language writer Usman Ali Ansari. Being member of an educated family, she had interest in reading and singing since childhood.

She began her singing and acting career at Radio Pakistan Karachi in 1957.  It was fortunate that Ghazala Rafiq's talents were noticed by the then renowned broadcaster Z. A. Bukhari who not only recorded her songs but encouraged her to participate in radio programs as a hostess and drama artist. Her first Urdu radio play was Aag which was produced by Zahid Naqvi. After that, she played leading roles in many other radio plays.

At radio, she learnt music from renowned musicians Amrao Bundu Khan and Master Muhammad Ibrahim. In the 1960s, she was one the most popular hostess's of Radio Pakistan Karachi. Her program Subah Dam Khawer Darwaza e Khula (Urdu: صبحدم دروازہ خاور کھلا) was especially popular among Radio listeners of that time.

With a vibrant voice and a deep sense of understanding of the characters she was asked to play, she attracted the attention of TV producers. She was among the first few Sindhi speaking women who appeared on TV. Moreover, she was the only actress who  gained widespread popularity in both Urdu as well as Sindhi language plays/serials.

She also acted in Sindhi film Rat Ja Rishta.

Urdu Plays 
Ghazala Rafique acted in scores of Urdu plays and serials of Pakistan Television (ptv) Centre Karachi. Her most popular plays/serials are listed below:

 Men Kaun Hoon (Urdu: میں کون ہوں)  
 Aye Ham Nafso (Urdu: ا ئے ہم نفسو)
 Akhiri Mom Bati (Urdu: آخری موم بتی)
 Mirza Ghalib (Urdu: مرزا غالب )
 Pat Jhar kay Baad (Urdu: پتجھڑکے بعد)
 Gudiya Ghar (Urdu: گڑیا گھر )

Sindhi Plays 
She was one of the most popular actress's of Sindhi TV plays till her sudden death in 1977. Some of her memorable Sindhi language serials include the following:

 Zeenat (Sindhi: زينت)
 Mau (Sindhi: ماءُ)
 Umar Marvi (Sindhi: عمرمارئي)
 Sassi Punhu (Sindhi: سسئي پنھون)
 Noori Jam Tamachi (Sindhi: نوري ڄام تماچي)
 Leela Chanesar (Sindhi: ليلا چنيسر) 
 Pachha and Parlau (Sindhi: پاڇا ۽ پڙلاءُ)
 Oondah Aen Roshni (Sindhi: اوندھ ۽ روشني)

She died on 24 January 1977 in Karachi.

References 

20th-century Pakistani actresses
Actresses from Karachi
1939 births
1977 deaths
Pakistani television actresses
Sindhi people